Weirsdale is a town in Marion County, Florida, United States. It is located near the intersection of State Road 25 and State Road 42. The community is part of the Ocala Metropolitan Statistical Area.

History
A post office called Weirsdale has been in operation since 1892. Weirsdale has historically been centered on the citrus packing industry.

Geography
Weirsdale is located at  (28.9817, -81.9244).

References

External links
 Ocala/Marion County Visitors & Convention Bureau
 'Jarhead' bear gets out of a jam in Florida

Unincorporated communities in Marion County, Florida
Unincorporated communities in Florida